Fathullah Rahmat (born 5 September 2002) is a Singaporean footballer currently playing as a midfielder for Tanjong Pagar United.

Club

South Korea training
In December 2022, it was announced that Yu En with Fathullah Rahmat will train with K-League 1 sides Incheon United and Suwon Samsung Bluewings youth team and senior squad of K-League 2 club Cheonan City from 26 December 2022 to 5 January 2023.

Career statistics

Club

Notes

References

2002 births
Living people
Singaporean footballers
Association football defenders
Singapore Premier League players
Tampines Rovers FC players